Dan Witz (born 1957) is a Brooklyn, NY based street artist and realist painter. He grew up in Chicago, IL, and graduated in 1981 from Cooper Union, on New York City's Lower East Side. Witz, consistently active since the late 1970s, is one of the pioneers of the street art movement.

Dan Witz's paintings have been shown in galleries throughout the US and Europe. In June 2010 a monograph, "Dan Witz. In Plain View. 30 Years of Artworks Illegal and Otherwise", was published by Ginkgo press.

Career
Dan Witz received a National Endowment of the Arts grant, in 1983, and fellowships from the New York Foundation of the Arts, in 1992 and 2000

In 1983 Dan Witz's first book, "The Birds of Manhattan"  was published by Skinny Books. His second book, In Plain View, was released in June 2010, by Gingko Press. In September 2010, Gingko Press will release "Hummingbirds, 2011".

The work of Dan Witz has appeared in Juxtapoz, Time, Arts Magazine, New York Magazine, Sites, Public Art Review, The New York Times, The Daily News, Newsday, The New Yorker, Harpers, and Adbusters. Dan was an early and frequent contributor to the definitive street art website and blog, the Wooster Collective.

Witz's work can be seen in the 2010 Banksy film, Exit Through the Gift Shop.
In 2006 the Lou Auguste documentary, Open Air, featured the studios and methods of Dan Witz as well as five other American street artists: Faile, Skewville, Mike De Foe, Espo, and Tiki Jay. His work was also featured in the 2005 film, To Be Seen, by Alice Arnold.

Dan Witz paintings have been shown in galleries worldwide; including Jonathan LeVine Gallery, in Chelsea, New York; Stolen Space Gallery, London, England; Carmichael Gallery, Los Angeles, CA; Addict Galley, Paris, France; White Walls, San Francisco, and DFN Gallery New York.

Recent publications
2010	"In Plain View: 30 Years of Artworks Illegal and Otherwise" Dan Witz, Introduction by David Lopes, Gingko Press
2010	"Hummingbirds 2011" Dan Witz, Gingko Press
2010	"Trespass, A History of Uncomissioned Urban Art" Edited by Ethel Seno, in collaboration with Marc and Sara Schiller, Taschen
2010	"Stickers, From Punk Rock to Contemporary Art" DB Burkeman/ Monica 	LoCascio, Rizzoli International Publications, Inc.
2010	"Street Art Cook Book, A Guide to Techniques and Materials", Benke Carlsson/ Hop Louie, Dokument Press
2010	"Beyond the street" Patrick Nguyen, Stuart Mackenzie, Gestalten 
2009	"The Thousands, painting outside, breaking in" DRAGO
2009	"Untitled II, The Beautiful Renaissance", Gary Shove
2008	"Untitled, Street Art in the Counter Culture", Gary Shove
2008	"Street Art". Cedar Lewisohn Tate Publishing
2007  	"Sticker City" Claudia Walde alias MadC
2007	"Street Renegades" Francesca Gavin
2006	"The Art of Rebellion 2" Christian Hundertmark/ C100
2004	"Graffiti World" Nicholas Ganz
2003	"I NY New York Street Art" Kelly Burns
2002	"Stencil Graffiti" Tristan Manco
1985	"Street Art" Allan Schwartzman

References

20th-century American painters
American male painters
21st-century American painters
21st-century American male artists
Living people
Public art
1957 births
20th-century American male artists